The Avro 533 Manchester was a First World War-era twin-engine biplane photo-reconnaissance and bomber aircraft designed and manufactured by Avro.

Design and development
Designed as a twin-engine bomber and photo-reconnaissance aircraft, the Avro 533 was a development of the earlier 523 and 529A. Originally designated the Avro 529B, the new 320 hp (240 kW) ABC Dragonfly I nine-cylinder engine was specified, but with a redesign in July 1918, the type number was subsequently changed to Avro 533. When the original engines were not available, the 300 hp (220 kW) Siddeley Puma engine was substituted on the second prototype in November 1918, this acquiring a new designation, the Avro 533A Manchester Mk II, and first flying in December that year. An American 400 hp (300 kW) Liberty engine was also proposed as an alternate engine.

Operational history
The Avro 533A Manchester Mk II flew for the first time in December 1918 with flight testing continuing with No. 186 Development Squadron. By March 1919, Avro sent the first prototype to Aeroplane and Armament Experimental Establishment at Martlesham Heath for official trials before its eventual return to the Avro factory at Hamble. The aircraft was a large, and mainly conventional design of wood-and-fabric construction typical of the time. Open cockpits were retained, although later modifications were planned for passenger compartments in the interior.

In December 1919, the second prototype received its Dragonfly I engines, becoming the Avro 533A Manchester Mk I. Other than the different engines, there were few differences between the two types, other than the Mk I having a slightly reduced lower wing surface, and enlarged tailfin and rudder to correct control problems indicated in testing. Flight testing also indicated a lower performance than anticipated which resulted in Avro reconsidering the type's further trials, and eventually led to the abandoning of the third prototype, which was never fitted with engines.

In March 1919, Avro proposed a passenger airliner, the Avro 537, that would be adapted from the earlier bomber version. The plans were ultimately abandoned and all the Type 533 prototypes were scrapped.

Variants
 Avro 533A Mk I – original design (first designated Avro 529B and later Avro 533)
 Avro 533A Mk II – Siddeley Puma engine

Specifications (Mk.II)

References
Notes

Bibliography

 Harlin, E.A. and G.A. Jenks. Avro: An Aircraft Album. Shepperton, Middlesex, UK: Ian Allan, 1973. .
 Holmes, Harry. Avro: The History of an Aircraft Company. Wiltshire, UK: The Crowood Press, 2004. .
 Jackson, Aubrey J. Avro Aircraft since 1908. London: Putnam, 1965. .
 Mason, Francis K. The British Bomber since 1914. London: Putnam, 1994. .
 Sharpe, Michael. Biplanes, Triplanes and Seaplanes: 300 of the World's Greatest Aircraft. London: Friedman/Fairfax Books, 2000. .
 Taylor, Michael J.H., ed. Jane's Fighting Aircraft of World War I. London: Studio Editions, 1990. .

External links

 Avro 533 Manchester I F3493
 Avro Manchester (533) – British Aircraft Directory
      

1910s British bomber aircraft
533 Manchester
Twin piston-engined tractor aircraft
Biplanes
Aircraft first flown in 1918